Denyse Plummer, full name Denyse Burnadette Kirline Plummer is a Calypso and Gospel singer from Trinidad and Tobago. She is the first female singer in the Caribbean to be born to a white father and a black mother, with Barbados' Alison Hinds being the second. She initially faced significant prejudice in a genre traditionally seen as Afro-Caribbean, but was eventually recognized as a leading calypso performer. 

Before entering the calypso world, Plummer was well known as a pop singer at intimate bars and hotels throughout Trinidad and Tobago.

Plummer made her debut in 1986 at Skinner Park, where she found herself at the end of an unappreciative audience who were not cheering her on.  
Plummer was enlisted by Phase II Pan Groove steelband arranger Len "Boogsie" Sharpe in 1986 to sing his band's Panorama entry.  It was then that Plummer started making a name for herself as a calypsonian. In 1988, with yet another Len "Boogsie" Sharpe pan tune, "Woman Is Boss" she arrived at the National Calypso Monarch finals and also won the Calypso Queen crown. Since then, she has taken the Calypso Queen crown a total of six times and has won 2nd place Crown three times.

Plummer is the fifth female calypsonian to win the Young Kings and National Calypso Queens competition and made it to the Calypso Monarch finals in 1983, 1988, 1992, 1994, and 2001, winning the title in 2001.

In 2002 and 2003 released "Fire" and "Tempo" respectively. In 2001, the Calypso Monarch title was won with the songs "Heroes" and "Nah leaving". Plummer left the calypso genre and moved on to the genre of gospel.

Discography
1986 Pan Rising/One Love
1987 Pan Progress/This Feeling Nice
1988 The Boss
1989 Still The Boss
1992 Carnival Killer
2000 W.I.Posse 2000
2001 Whole Trinidanian
2001 Nah Leaving
2001 Heroes
2002 No Winners

References

Terry Joseph at I Level: Redemption song
Calypso Archives

See also
List of calypsos with sociopolitical influences

Calypsonians
20th-century Trinidad and Tobago women singers
20th-century Trinidad and Tobago singers
1954 births
Trinidad and Tobago people of European descent
Living people